Welwyn North railway station serves the villages of Digswell and Welwyn in Hertfordshire, England. Train services are currently provided by Thameslink.

Location
It is still called High Welwyn as Digswell Parish was dissolved in 1926 when it became absorbed into Welwyn Garden City. Just to the south of the station the line passes over the Digswell Viaduct, and to the north through two tunnels. This section (between Digswell Junction to the south of the viaduct and Woolmer Green) is a significant bottleneck where four lines are reduced to two.

History

Construction of the station and viaduct began in 1848 and the line was opened in 1850 as part of the Great Northern Railway. It was built by contractor Thomas Brassey out of red brick produced locally from the Welwyn Brick Fields at Ayot Green.

The viaduct is built on floating foundations as the bed of the Mimram Valley was not stable enough for normal ones. These floats consisted of timber beams filled with burned chalk onto which the towers were built.  The tunnels were hand-dug by the thousands of manual workers, mainly Irish, for whom a new tented village was built centred on the Cowper Arms, itself built to stop the workers descending on the taverns in Welwyn. The viaduct lay midway between Welwyn Junction (the sign still remains), which was the point at which the main line was crossed by the Hertford to Luton line, and High Welwyn, where the station is located.

The Welwyn Tunnel rail crash occurred in 1866 in the longer of the two tunnels to the north of the station.

In its heyday the station served local agriculture as well as passenger traffic. There was a goods yard and goods shed on the west side and sidings to the north and south. These included an impressive set of coal drops and, from 1884, a private siding for the adjacent beehive works (E. H. Taylor Ltd. from 1900). The complex included three railway worker's cottages on the west (down) side and two on the east (up). Much of the land to build the station was purchased from local landowner George Augustus 6th Earl Cowper, who built the Railway Inn (later renamed the Cowper Arms Hotel) on land adjoining to the west. This is contemporary with the station and built in the same red brick, reputedly by the same navvies (who went on to frequent it).

Today the goods yard has made way for a car park but the main station building, the worker's cottages and the Cowper Arms remain.

The station is a rare survival of architecture from the early days of the GNR and this is now recognised with listed building status. The main station building, the remaining portion of the footbridge and the tunnel portal to the north are all Grade II listed, while Welwyn Viaduct to the south is Grade II* listed.

Services
All services at Welwyn North are operated by Thameslink using  EMUs.

The typical off-peak service in trains per hour is:
 2 tph to 

During the peak hours, all services are extended beyond Letchworth Garden City to Cambridge. On Sundays, the station is served by an hourly service between London King's Cross and Cambridge.

References

Welwyn's Railways: A History of the Great Northern Line, 1850–1986, Tom W. Gladwin, Peter W. Neville, Douglas E. White, The Book Castle (November 1986)
History of Welwyn by Gordon Longmead

External links

Railway stations in Hertfordshire
DfT Category E stations
Former Great Northern Railway stations
Railway stations in Great Britain opened in 1850
Railway stations served by Govia Thameslink Railway
Welwyn